"En händig man" ("A handy man") is a pop song written by Swedish singer and composer Per Gessle, which was released as the lead single from his sixth studio album En händig man. The single spent 16 weeks on the Swedish Singles Chart and peaked at number one for one week. The song also charted on Svensktoppen for four weeks, peaking at number seven on the chart.

Formats and track listings
Swedish CD single
(0946 3972372 0; 23 May 2007)
"En händig man" - 3:01
"Vet du vad jag egentligen vill?" (instrumental) - 2:03

Music videos
A video for the song was directed by Jeffery Richt. It was shot outside of Halmstad and features Gessle driving a car and singing in a rocky coast.

Charts

References

2007 singles
Per Gessle songs
Number-one singles in Sweden
Songs written by Per Gessle
Music videos directed by Anton Corbijn
2007 songs
EMI Records singles